Haslum is a station on the Kolsås Line on the Oslo Metro. It is between Avløs and Gjønnes,  from Stortinget. It serves the neighborhood Haslum.

The station was opened 1 July 1924 as part of the tramway Lilleaker Line.

Along with most of the line, Haslum closed for upgrades on 1 July 2006 and its service was temporarily provided by bus. Haslum among other things, received longer platforms which can accommodate trains with up to six cars like most of the subway system. It reopened on 15 December 2013.

References

External links

Oslo Metro stations in Bærum
Railway stations opened in 1924
1924 establishments in Norway